The Katětov–Tong insertion theorem is a theorem of point-set topology proved independently by Miroslav Katětov and Hing Tong in the 1950s.  The theorem states the following:

Then there exists a continuous function  with 

This theorem has a number of applications and is the first of many classical insertion theorems. In particular it implies the Tietze extension theorem and consequently Urysohn's lemma, and so the conclusion of the theorem is equivalent to normality.

References

General topology
Theorems in topology